Lutra castiglionis, the Castiglione otter or Corsican otter, is an extinct species of otter that was endemic to Corsica during the Pleistocene.

Taxonomy
Lutra castiglionis was described in 2000, originally under a new genus, Cyrnolutra. In 2006, it was transferred into the genus Lutra. A possible ancestor of this species is Lutra simplicidens, known from mainland Europe.

Description
The Castiglione otter was probably very well adapted to a riverine aquatic way of life. Remains show a flattening of the sacrum, indicating it had a much stronger tail than most other otters, which would allow it to propel itself more efficiently in aquatic environments.

Remains of the Castiglione otter are known from Castiglione Cave in Corsica. These fossils have been dated to the Mid Pleistocene, approximately 157,500 BP (+22,200/-17,300).

References

Otters
Prehistoric mustelids
Pleistocene carnivorans
Prehistoric mammals of Europe
Pleistocene mammals of Europe
Mustelidae